Robert Harding Whittaker (December 27, 1920 – October 20, 1980) was an American plant ecologist, active in the 1950s to the 1970s. He was the first to propose the five kingdom taxonomic classification of the world's biota into the Animalia, Plantae, Fungi, Protista, and Monera in 1969. He also proposed the Whittaker Biome Classification, which categorized biome-types upon two abiotic factors: temperature and precipitation.

Whittaker was elected to the National Academy of Sciences in 1974, received the Ecological Society of America's Eminent Ecologist Award in 1981, and was otherwise widely recognized and honored. He collaborated with many other ecologists including George Woodwell (Dartmouth), W. A. Niering, F. H. Bormann (Yale) and G. E. Likens (Cornell), and was particularly active in cultivating international collaborations.

Early life 
Born in Wichita, Kansas, he obtained a B.A. at Washburn Municipal College (now Washburn University) in Topeka, Kansas, and, following military service, his Ph.D. in Biology at the University of Illinois in 1948.

Career 
Whittaker held teaching and research positions at Washington State College in Pullman, Washington from 1948 to 1951, and then moved Hanford Laboratories Aquatic Biology
Unit near Richland, Washington. In 1954, he was hired as an instructor in the Department of Biology of Brooklyn College, the City University of New York. In the 1960s, he worked at the University of California, Irvine and Cornell University.

Family
Whittaker married biochemist Clara Buehl (then a coworker at Hanford Laboratories) in 1952. They had three children. Clara was diagnosed with cancer in 1972, and she later died December 31, 1976.

Whittaker married graduate student Linda Olsvig in 1979. He himself was diagnosed with lung cancer and died October 20, 1980.

Works
Robert H. Whittaker Communities and Ecosystems, Macmillan, 1975. 
Robert H. Whittaker(Ed), Classification of Plant Communities, 1978 (Handbook of Vegetation Science), Kluwer Academic Publishers,

References

Cornell University faculty
American ecologists
1920 births
1980 deaths
Ecological succession
People from Wichita, Kansas
Plant ecologists
Members of the United States National Academy of Sciences
Deaths from lung cancer in New York (state)
Brooklyn College faculty